Cetostearyl alcohol, cetearyl alcohol or cetylstearyl alcohol is a mixture of fatty alcohols, consisting predominantly of cetyl (16 C) and stearyl alcohols (18 C) and is classified as a fatty alcohol. It is used as an emulsion stabilizer, opacifying agent, and foam boosting surfactant, as well as an aqueous and nonaqueous viscosity-increasing agent. It imparts an emollient feel to the skin and can be used in water-in-oil emulsions, oil-in-water emulsions, and anhydrous formulations.  It is commonly used in hair conditioners and other hair products.

References 

Fatty alcohols
Non-ionic surfactants
Alkanols